Pachk or Pochak may refer to:
 Pochak, Hormozgan
 Pachk, Razavi Khorasan